This is a list of the National Register of Historic Places listings in Price County, Wisconsin. It is intended to provide a comprehensive listing of entries in the National Register of Historic Places that are located in Price County, Wisconsin.  The locations of National Register properties for which the latitude and longitude coordinates are included below may be seen in a map.

There are 13 properties and districts listed on the National Register in the county. Another property was once listed but has been removed.

Current listings

|}

Formerly listed properties

|}

See also
 List of National Historic Landmarks in Wisconsin
 National Register of Historic Places listings in Wisconsin
 Listings in neighboring counties: Ashland, Iron, Lincoln, Oneida, Rusk, Sawyer, Taylor, Vilas

References

Price